Paolo Giancarlo de la Haza Urquiza (born November 30, 1983, in Lima, Peru) is a Peruvian football player who plays for Atlético Grau. He was a member of Peru national football team at 2007 Copa America.

Club career
On July 23, 2007 he signed a 3-year agreement with the Ukrainian side but In February 2009 he returned to Peru to play for Alianza Lima. He transferred to China Super League club Jiangsu Sainty at March 2011.

International career
De la Haza has made 23 appearances for the Peru national football team.

References

External links
 
 
 

1983 births
Living people
Footballers from Lima
Association football midfielders
Peruvian footballers
Peru international footballers
2007 Copa América players
Sport Boys footballers
Cienciano footballers
FC Chornomorets Odesa players
Club Alianza Lima footballers
Beitar Jerusalem F.C. players
Jiangsu F.C. players
Club Deportivo Universidad César Vallejo footballers
Sporting Cristal footballers
Peruvian expatriate footballers
Expatriate footballers in China
Expatriate footballers in Israel
Expatriate footballers in Ukraine
Peruvian expatriate sportspeople in China
Peruvian expatriate sportspeople in Israel
Peruvian expatriate sportspeople in Ukraine
Peruvian Primera División players
Chinese Super League players
Ukrainian Premier League players
Israeli Premier League players